Soil production function refers to the rate of bedrock weathering into soil as a function of soil thickness. 

A general model suggested that the rate of physical weathering of bedrock (de/dt) can be represented as an exponential decline with soil thickness:

where h is soil thickness [m], P0 [mm/year] is the potential (or maximum) weathering rate of bedrock and k [m−1] is an empirical constant.

The reduction of weathering rate with thickening of soil is related to the exponential decrease of temperature amplitude with increasing depth below the soil surface, and also the exponential decrease in average water penetration (for freely-drained soils). Parameters P0 and k are related to the climate and type of parent materials.  found the value of P0 ranges from 0.08 to 2.0 mm/yr for sites in Northern California, and 0.05–0.14 mm/yr for sites in Southeastern Australia. Meanwhile values of k do not vary significantly, ranging from 2 to 4 m−1.

A number of landscape evolution models have adopted the so-called humped model. This model dates back to G.K. Gilbert's Report on the Geology of the Henry Mountains (1877). Gilbert reasoned that the weathering of bedrock was fastest under an intermediate thickness of soil and slower under exposed bedrock or under thick mantled soil. This is because chemical weathering requires the presence of water. Under thin soil or exposed bedrock water tends to run off, reducing the chance of the decomposition of bedrock.

See also
Biorhexistasy
Hillslope evolution
Parent material
Pedogenesis
Soil functions
Weathering

References

Bibliography

Mathematical modeling
Pedology